Alvin Mentian Kamara (born July 25, 1995) is an American football running back for the New Orleans Saints of the National Football League (NFL). He played college football at Tennessee after transferring from Hutchinson Community College and was drafted by the Saints in the third round of the 2017 NFL Draft. He was named the NFL Rookie of the Year in 2017, has been a Pro Bowler in all five of his NFL seasons, and is a two-time second-team All-Pro. In 2020, Kamara became the second player in NFL history to score six rushing touchdowns in a single game, tying Ernie Nevers.

Early life and high school career
Kamara was born to a Liberian mother. He attended Norcross High School in Norcross, Georgia. He played high school football for the Blue Devils football team. As a junior in 2011 he rushed for 1,300 yards with 17 touchdowns. As a senior in 2012 he rushed for 2,264 yards with 26 touchdowns, and caught 22 passes for 286 yards and five touchdowns in leading his high school to its first state championship.
Kamara was named Georgia’s Mr. Football by the Atlanta Journal-Constitution, selected  Class 6A Player of the Year, and earned first-team All-State honors from the Georgia Sports Writers Association. In addition, he was chosen to participate in the 2013 Under Armour All-America Game.

Coming out of high school, Kamara was considered to be one of the top running back prospects in the nation. He was rated the No. 1 all-purpose back in the 247Composite, the No. 5 player in Georgia, and the No. 42 player nationally in 2012. Rivals.com rated Kamara as the No. 6 player in Georgia.

Kamara received a scholarship offer from Syracuse University as a junior in high school. As a senior he committed to play college football at the University of Alabama under head coach Nick Saban.

College career

University of Alabama
Kamara's short time at University of Alabama was "a rough experience". He had knee surgery during the preseason, then redshirted as a true freshman when he was unable to break into a recruitment class that featured three other future NFL running backs in Derrick Henry, T. J. Yeldon, and Kenyan Drake. Due to "behavioral issues", Saban banned Kamara from practicing with the team and suspended him from their bowl game.

Hutchinson Community College
In 2014, Kamara transferred from Alabama to Hutchinson Community College in Kansas for his redshirt freshman season. In nine games, Kamara ran for 1,211 yards (134.6 per game) with 18 touchdowns and led the Blue Dragons with 1,469 yards of total offense and 21 touchdowns. Kamara was named NJCAA All American. His successful season with Blue Dragons propelled Kamara to one of the top JUCO prospects in the nation. He earned a 5-star rating from the Rivals.com and Scout.com recruiting networks. He was offered by both Tennessee and the Georgia Bulldogs before ultimately committing to the Volunteers.

University of Tennessee

2015 season 
In 2015, Kamara transferred to the University of Tennessee to play under head coach Butch Jones. As a redshirt sophomore, Kamara played in all 13 games and shared the backfield with Jalen Hurd and John Kelly. He accounted for 144 yards and two touchdowns in his Tennessee debut against Bowling Green at Nissan Stadium in Nashville, Tennessee on September 5, 2015; his 144 rushing yards set a school record for most rushing yards in a debut game. He became the second Volunteer in history with a rushing touchdown and punt return for touchdown in the same game with a two-yard rushing touchdown and a 50-yard punt return touchdown against Western Carolina. On November 14, against North Texas, he had 15 carries for 127 yards and two touchdowns in the home victory. Tennessee finished with a 9–4 record and qualified for the Outback Bowl against #12 Northwestern. In the 45–6 victory over the Wildcats, he had 53 rushing yards and a touchdown. In the entire 2015 season, he accounted for 698 yards (53.7 yards/game) with seven rushing touchdowns. He averaged 6.5 yards per carry, which was third in the SEC. He was second on team in receptions with 34 for 291 yards and three receiving touchdowns. As a punt returner, he had eight returns for 100 yards (12.5 average) with a touchdown.

2016 season
In 2016, Kamara was a key contributor for the Volunteers in his redshirt junior season. The running back personnel was the same as the last season for Kamara. In the 2016 Pilot Flying J Battle at Bristol, he had six touches for 34 yards and one touchdown in the 45–24 victory over Virginia Tech. He started his first career game at running back for the Vols in a 28–19 victory over Ohio on September 17. He had 79 all-purpose yards in a 38–28 win against #19 Florida, including six yards on two carries, 12 yards on one reception and career highs of 61 punt-return yards and six punt returns. He had 138 all-purpose yards, including a receiving touchdown, in a 34–31 win against #25 Georgia. He had a career-best game the following week in a 45–38 2-OT loss against #8 Texas A&M at Kyle Field. He rushed for 127 yards and two rushing touchdowns, and had eight receptions for 161 yards and a receiving touchdown. In the loss, Kamara set a school record with 312 all-purpose yards, breaking a mark set by Chuck Webb in 1989. In the next game against #1 Alabama, he was limited to eight carries for 21 yards but had the Vols' lone touchdown in the 49–10 defeat. He missed some playing time due to being injured. He returned on November 12 in a 49–36 victory over Kentucky. Against the Wildcats, he had 10 carries for 128 yards and two touchdowns. In the 63–37 victory over Missouri, he had 55 rushing yards and two more rushing touchdowns. In the regular season finale against Vanderbilt, he had three total touchdowns (two rushing and one receiving) and 141 scrimmage yards in the 45–34 defeat. In the final game of his collegiate career, he had seven carries for 31 yards and seven receptions for 46 yards in the victory over #24 Nebraska in the Music City Bowl. He finished third in the SEC in touchdowns for the 2016 season.

Following the conclusion of the 2016 season, Kamara decided to forgo his redshirt senior season and enter the 2017 NFL Draft. In his two seasons as a Volunteer, he started in only eight of 24 games due to sharing the backfield with Jalen Hurd, but he amassed almost 2,000 yards from scrimmage and averaged a touchdown per game.

College statistics

Professional career
Kamara achieved the highest Wonderlic test score of running backs participating in the NFL Combine that year. He participated at Tennessee's Pro Day, but chose to only run positional routes, the short shuttle, and three-cone drill with 19 other teammates in front of representatives and scouts from every team. He attended five private workouts and visits held by the Carolina Panthers, Chicago Bears, Minnesota Vikings, New Orleans Saints, and Philadelphia Eagles. NFL draft experts and analysts projected him as a second round pick, ranked as either the fourth-best running back (by NFLDraftScout.com, ESPN, and NFL analyst Mike Mayock) in the draft, fifth-best (Bucky Brooks), or seventh-best (by Sports Illustrated).

The New Orleans Saints selected Kamara in the third round with the 67th overall pick in the 2017 NFL Draft. He was the second of six Tennessee Volunteers to be selected that year. He was the fifth running back selected. , he also serves as the Saints' emergency quarterback.

2017 season

Kamara split backfield duties with Mark Ingram II through the 2017 season, with fewer carries but more receptions than his teammate. In the September 11 season opener against the Minnesota Vikings on Monday Night Football, Kamara debuted with seven rushes for 18 yards, four receptions for 20 yards, and one kickoff return for 26 yards. In Week 2 against the New England Patriots, his role in the passing game expanded with three receptions for 51 yards in the 36–20 loss; he also returned three kickoffs, but would return only one more until Week 16 of the season. Kamara scored his first professional touchdown in Week 3 against the Carolina Panthers. In Week 4, he had 96 yards from scrimmage, including 10 receptions for 71 yards and a 12-yard touchdown catch. This was followed by 10 carries for 75 yards in Week 5, and 107 yards from scrimmage in Week 6 against the Green Bay Packers. After the bye week, Kamara had a touchdown against the Chicago Bears, and then 68 rushing yards including a 3-yard touchdown, along with 84 receiving yards including a 33-yard touchdown in a breakout victory over the Tampa Bay Buccaneers. During a Week 12 loss to the Los Angeles Rams, Kamara provided 101 receiving yards and 87 rushing yards including a 74-yard rushing touchdown. He became the first player since Herschel Walker in 1986 to compile 500 rushing and receiving yards in his first 11 career games, and was the first non-quarterback to average over 7.0 yards per carry through 12 weeks since the merger. In Week 13, Kamara rushed for 60 yards and two touchdowns and caught 5 passes for 66 yards, becoming the fourth 600/600 rookie in NFL history, and tying Todd Gurley for the league lead in total touchdowns with 11. On the first drive of the Week 13 match-up with Atlanta, Kamara suffered a concussion and missed the rest of the game. He returned the next week with 44 rushing yards and 45 receiving yards and a touchdown against the Jets. On December 19, 2017, Kamara was named to the Pro Bowl as a rookie alongside Mark Ingram II, becoming the first-ever pair of running backs from the same team to earn the honors. He was named to the NFL All-Rookie Team. After 32 rushing with 58 receiving yards in a Week 16 win over the Atlanta Falcons in the season finale, Kamara had a 106-yard kick return for a touchdown, 44 rushing yards and another touchdown, and 84 receiving yards.

In 2017, his 728 yards rushing and 826 yards receiving was the first 700/700 season by a Saint, third by an NFL rookie, and the 11th 700/800 season by any NFL player. His 728 rushing yards finished third among rookies behind rushing leader Kareem Hunt and Leonard Fournette. His 81 receptions on the season were first among all rookies and second in the league among running backs behind Le'Veon Bell, and his 826 receiving yards finished first among running backs. Kamara and Ingram became the first running back duo in NFL history to each have over 1,500 scrimmage yards in the same season. Among non-quarterbacks with 100+ carries, his 6.07 yards per rush was the most ever by an NFL rookie. It also was the most ever by any Saints player, and the third most by any NFL player since 1980, trailing only Jamaal Charles (6.38 in 2010) and Barry Sanders (6.13 in 1997).

In 2017, the Saints finished with an 11–5 record and won the NFC South. In the Wild Card Round against the Carolina Panthers, Kamara had 23 rushing yards, a rushing touchdown, and one reception for 10 yards in the 31–26 victory. In the Divisional Round against the Minnesota Vikings, he had a 14-yard receiving touchdown from Drew Brees in the fourth quarter to put the Saints up 21–20. However, the Saints would lose to the Vikings by a score of 29–24 on the last play of the game. After a spectacular rookie season, Kamara was named the NFL Offensive Rookie of the Year and was named to the Pro Bowl and All-Rookie Team. He was ranked #20 by his fellow players on the NFL Top 100 Players of 2018.

2018 season

With teammate Mark Ingram II suspended for the first four games of the regular season, Kamara started the 2018 season as the Saints' main running back. In the season opener, a 48–40 loss to the Tampa Bay Buccaneers, Kamara had eight carries for 29 rushing yards and two rushing touchdowns to go along with nine receptions for 112 receiving yards and a receiving touchdown. After 99 total yards against the Cleveland Browns in Week 2, Kamara had 66 yards rushing to go with a career-best 124 yards receiving on 15 receptions in Week 3 against the Atlanta Falcons. The following week against the New York Giants, Kamara had career-bests in carries (19), rushing yards (134) and rushing touchdowns (3) along with 47 receiving yards to take the NFL lead in total and rushing touchdowns, yards from scrimmage, and all-purpose yards. With his Week 4 performance, Kamara became the first player in NFL history to have 1,000 rushing yards and 1,000 receiving yards in his first 20 games. Ingram returned from suspension for Week 5 against the Washington Redskins and Kamara totaled 39 scrimmage yards in the 43–19 victory. In Week 8, against the Minnesota Vikings, he had 76 scrimmage yards to go along with a rushing touchdown and a receiving touchdown in the 30–20 victory. In a Week 9 45–35 victory over the Los Angeles Rams, Kamara scored three total touchdowns in the first half (two rushing and one receiving). He finished the game with 116 scrimmage yards. In Week 10, against the Cincinnati Bengals, he had 102 scrimmage yards and two rushing touchdowns in the 51–14 victory. In Week 15, a narrow 12–9 victory over the Carolina Panthers, Kamara had the Saints' lone touchdown on a 16-yard rush. During Week 16 against the Pittsburgh Steelers, Kamara scored two rushing touchdowns in the 31–28 victory. He tied the franchise record for most touchdowns in a single season. Kamara sat out Week 17 with the Saints having already clinched the first seed for the NFC playoffs. Overall, he finished his second professional season with 883 rushing yards and 14 rushing touchdowns to go along with 81 receptions for 709 receiving yards and four receiving touchdowns. He was named to the Pro Bowl for his accomplishments in the 2018 season.

In the Divisional Round against the Philadelphia Eagles, Kamara had 16 carries for 71 rushing yards and four receptions for 35 receiving yards in the 20–14 victory. In the NFC Championship, he had eight carries for 15 rushing yards in addition to 11 receptions for 96 receiving yards in the 26–23 controversial overtime loss to the Los Angeles Rams. He was ranked 14th by his fellow players on the NFL Top 100 Players of 2019.

2019 season

During the season-opener against the Houston Texans on Monday Night Football, Kamara had 169 scrimmage yards in the Saints' 30–28 victory. Two weeks later against the Seattle Seahawks, Kamara had 161 scrimmage yards, a rushing touchdown, and a receiving touchdown in the 33–27 win. During Week 5 against the Tampa Bay Buccaneers, Kamara had 16 carries for 62 rushing yards and caught six passes for 42 receiving yards in the 31–24 win. During Weeks 6 and 7, Kamara began battling injuries to his ankle and knee, causing him to miss two games in Weeks 7 and 8, but he returned in Week 10 following a Week 9 bye. In Week 16 against the Tennessee Titans, Kamara rushed 11 times for 80 yards and two rushing touchdowns and caught six passes for 30 receiving yards during the 38–28 win. In the following week's game against the Carolina Panthers, Kamara rushed for two touchdowns during the 42–10 win in Week 17. Overall, Kamara finished with 797 rushing yards and five rushing touchdowns to go along with 81 receptions for 533 receiving yards and one receiving touchdown. He made his third Pro Bowl in as many professional seasons. In the NFC Wild Card Round against the Minnesota Vikings, Kamara had seven carries for 21 rushing yards and a rushing touchdown and caught eight passes for 34 receiving yards during the 26–20 overtime loss. He was ranked 42nd by his fellow players on the NFL Top 100 Players of 2020.

2020 season

The day before the Saints’ 2020 season opener Kamara signed a five-year contract extension worth $75 million.
In Week 1 against the Tampa Bay Buccaneers, Kamara had a rushing and a receiving touchdown during the 34–23 win. In a Week 2 game against the Las Vegas Raiders on Monday Night Football, he had 174 scrimmage yards (79 rushing, 95 receiving) and two rushing touchdowns including the first ever touchdown scored in Allegiant Stadium and the first ever NFL touchdown scored in Las Vegas in the 34–24 loss. During Sunday Night Football against the Green Bay Packers in Week 3, Kamara finished with 58 rushing yards, 139 receiving yards, and two total touchdowns as the Saints lost by a score of 30–37.
In Week 7 against the Carolina Panthers, Kamara finished with 148 scrimmage yards during the 27–24 win. In Week 8, against the Chicago Bears, he had 163 scrimmage yards in the 26–23 overtime victory. In Week 10, against the San Francisco 49ers, he had 98 scrimmage yards, two rushing touchdowns, and one receiving touchdown in the 27–13 victory.

On Christmas Day, 2020, Kamara rushed for 155 yards in a 52–33 victory over the Minnesota Vikings and tied the NFL record of six rushing touchdowns in a single game. For his Week 16 performance, Kamara was named the NFC Offensive Player of the Week. Kamara was forced to miss Week 17 against the Panthers due to being placed on the reserve/COVID-19 list on January 1, 2021. Overall, he finished the 2020 regular season with 187 carries for 932 rushing yards and 16 rushing touchdowns to go along with 83 receptions for 756 receiving yards and five receiving touchdowns. His 16 rushing touchdowns tied him with Dalvin Cook for second-most in the NFL, trailing only Derrick Henry's 17 touchdowns. Kamara became the first player in NFL history to record at least 500 rushing yards and 500 receiving yards in each of his first four seasons. He earned votes for AP Offensive Player of the Year, but finished sixth. He made his fourth Pro Bowl for his achievements in the 2020 season.

Kamara was activated from the COVID-19 list on January 9, 2021. In the Wild Card Round against the Chicago Bears, Kamara rushed for 99 yards and a touchdown and caught two passes for 17 yards during the 21–9 win. In the Divisional Round against the Tampa Bay Buccaneers, Kamara recorded 105 yards from scrimmage during the 30–20 loss. He was ranked 14th by his fellow players on the NFL Top 100 Players of 2021.

2021 season

In Week 7, Kamara had 10 catches for 128 yards and a touchdown, along with 51 rushing yards, in a 13–10 win over the Seattle Seahawks, earning NFC Offensive Player of the Week. In the game, Kamara also reached 3,000 receiving yards in his career, becoming the fastest player in NFL history to reach 3,000 yards in both receiving and rushing. The previous record was 70 games, held by Roger Craig, while Kamara achieved the feat in 66 games. In Week 14, after missing the previous four games due to injury, Kamara returned with 27 rushes for 120 yards and a touchdown along with four receptions for 25 yards in a 30–9 win over the New York Jets. He closed out the regular season with 30 carries for 146 rushing yards in a 30–20 victory over the Atlanta Falcons. He finished the 2021 season with 240 carries for 898 rushing yards and four rushing touchdowns to go along with 47 receptions for 439 receiving yards and five receiving touchdowns. In 2021, he earned his fifth Pro Bowl nomination, becoming the first player in franchise history to be named to the Pro Bowl in each of their first five seasons. He was ranked 51st by his fellow players on the NFL Top 100 Players of 2022.

2022 season

In Week 5, against the 2022 Seattle Seahawks, Kamara had 103 rushing yards and 91 receiving yards in the 39–32 victory. In Weeks 6–7, Kamara recorded over 100 scrimmage yards in both games against the Cincinnati Bengals and Arizona Cardinals. In Week 8, against the Las Vegas Raiders, he had 158 scrimmage yards and three total touchdowns in the 24–0 victory. In three of the last four games of the season, Kamara totaled over 100 scrimmage yards. Overall, Kamara finished the 2022 season with 223 carries for 897 rushing yards and two rushing touchdowns to go along with 57 receptions for 490 receiving yards and two receiving touchdowns in 15 games.

NFL career statistics

Personal life

Business ventures
Kamara owns the Big Squeezy, a Louisiana-based juice and smoothie chain with locations in Baton Rouge, Hammond, Mandeville, and New Orleans. In February 2021, the chain sponsored NASCAR Xfinity Series driver Ryan Vargas and his No. 6 JD Motorsports car in the Super Start Batteries 188 at the Daytona International Speedway Road Course.

On June 20, 2021, NASCAR named Kamara as the Growth and Engagement Advisor. He became interested in the sport the previous year when NASCAR and its drivers participated in racial justice activism such as the sanctioning body's ban of the Confederate battle flag from race tracks and Bubba Wallace's Black Lives Matter-themed car.

Legal issues
On February 6, 2022, following the Pro Bowl in Las Vegas, Kamara was arrested and booked into the Clark County Detention Center for battery resulting in substantial bodily harm. The incident allegedly took place at a local nightclub the night prior. Video surveillance shows Kamara punching a man approximately eight times.

References

External links

New Orleans Saints bio
Tennessee Volunteers bio

1995 births
Living people
American people of Liberian descent
People from Norcross, Georgia
Sportspeople from the Atlanta metropolitan area
Players of American football from Georgia (U.S. state)
American football running backs
Norcross High School alumni
Alabama Crimson Tide football players
Hutchinson Blue Dragons football players
Tennessee Volunteers football players
New Orleans Saints players
National Conference Pro Bowl players
National Football League Offensive Rookie of the Year Award winners
Prisoners and detainees of Nevada